Azna may refer to:
 Azna County, a county in Lorestan Province in Iran
 Azna, Lorestan, the capital of Azna County, Iran
 Azna, Dorud, a village in Lorestan Province, Iran
 Azna Rural District, a rural district in Lorestan Province, Iran
 Azna Mehalmak, a village in Lorestan Province, Iran
 Azna (people), animists among the Hausa people